In Greek mythology, Golgos is the son of Aphrodite and Adonis, brother of Beroe, and founder of the Ancient city of Golgi (Also known as Cyprian Golgi, located in modern day Larnaca District in Cyprus).

Note

References 

 Graves, Robert, The Greek Myths, Harmondsworth, London, England, Penguin Books, 1960. 
 Graves, Robert, The Greek Myths: The Complete and Definitive Edition. Penguin Books Limited. 2017. 

Children of Aphrodite
Demigods in classical mythology
Cypriot mythology
Family of Adonis